Wooburn Green railway station was a railway station which served Wooburn Green, Buckinghamshire, England, on the Wycombe Railway. It was opened in 1854, with the station located near the bottom of Whitepit lane. The station became a halt in 1968 because of a decreased service on the line.

The station and line were closed in 1970. Unlike Loudwater station (demolished in the mid-1970s for development), the station platform and building remained in situ as a private dwelling, until the late 1980s. The station was demolished to make way for the Old Station Way development, built around 1990. A railway conservation path follows the route of the former railway towards Bourne End.

References

External links 
 Image of the station site
 The station on a navigable 1946 O. S. map
 Extract from the 1945 OS map showing the line

Former Great Western Railway stations
Disused railway stations in Buckinghamshire
Railway stations in Great Britain opened in 1854
Railway stations in Great Britain closed in 1970